Lyriq Bent (born Martin Lyriq Bent; January 3, 1979) is a Jamaican-Canadian actor. He is known for his roles in the Saw films, the television series Rookie Blue, and The Book of Negroes. Bent portrays Jamie Overstreet in the Netflix series She's Gotta Have It, based on the film of the same name.

Early life
Martin Lyriq Bent was born on January 3, 1979 in Kingston, Jamaica, and moved to Toronto, Ontario, Canada, when he was six years old.

Career
Bent has starred in various lead and supporting roles both in film and television since he began his acting career in the early 2000s. Prior to landing a co-starring role in the drama series Angela's Eyes, he guest starred on the UPN series Kevin Hill opposite Taye Diggs, and USA Network's Kojak opposite Ving Rhames. After appearing on several television shows, Playback Magazine listed him as one of Canada's top rising stars.

Bent attracted further attention when he co-starred in the hit horror films Saw II and Saw III as Officer Daniel Rigg. He later starred as one of the central characters in Saw IV.

From 2010 to 2014 he co-starred in the Canadian television series Rookie Blue, portraying Staff Sergeant Frank Best.

In 2015 Bent portrayed Chekura Tiano in the television miniseries The Book of Negroes, based on the best-selling novel by Lawrence Hill. For this role, Bent won the award for Best Actor in a Television Film or Miniseries at the 2016 4th Canadian Screen Awards.

He was a Canadian Screen Award nominee for Best Lead Performance in a Web Program or Series at the 10th Canadian Screen Awards in 2022 for the web series For the Record.

Filmography

Film

Television

Video Games

References

External links
 
 

Jamaican emigrants to Canada
Black Canadian male actors
Canadian male film actors
Canadian male television actors
Canadian male voice actors
Living people
Male actors from Toronto
People from Kingston, Jamaica
21st-century Canadian male actors
Seneca College alumni
1979 births